Abigail Jane Sellen  is a Canadian cognitive scientist, industrial engineer, and computer scientist who works for Microsoft Research in Cambridge. She is also an honorary professor at the University of Nottingham and University College London.

Education
Sellen earned a master's degree in industrial engineering from the University of Toronto, and a PhD in cognitive science from the University of California, San Diego under the supervision of Don Norman.

Career and research
Sellen's research investigates human–computer interaction (HCI). She has worked as a research fellow at Darwin College, Cambridge as well as for various corporate research laboratories including Xerox PARC, Apple Inc., and HP Labs before joining Microsoft in 2004.

With Richard H. R. Harper, Sellen wrote The Myth of the Paperless Office (MIT Press, 2001).

Awards and honours
She is a fellow of the Royal Society (FRS), the Royal Academy of Engineering (FREng) and the British Computer Society. She was inducted into the CHI Academy in 2011. In 2016 she became a fellow of the Association for Computing Machinery (ACM) "for contributions to human-computer interaction and the design of human-centered technology". She was elected as a foreign member of the National Academy of Engineering in 2020, for "contributions that ensure consideration of human capabilities in the design of computer systems".

References

Year of birth missing (living people)
Living people
Canadian computer scientists
Canadian women computer scientists
Scientists at PARC (company)
Microsoft Research people
Fellows of the Association for Computing Machinery
Fellows of the Royal Academy of Engineering
Female Fellows of the Royal Academy of Engineering
Members of the United States National Academy of Engineering
21st-century women engineers
Fellows of the Women's Engineering Society
Fellows of the Royal Society